Each team in the 2014 Indonesian Inter Island Cup qualification named a minimum of 18 players in their squad (three of whom were goalkeepers) by the deadline that Liga Indonesia determined was on 7 January 2014. Injury replacements were allowed until 24 hours before the team's first match.

Sumatra zone
Sriwijaya
Manager:  Subangkit

Semen Padang
Manager:  Jafri Sastra

Java zone

Group 1
Persib Bandung
Manager:  Djajang Nurdjaman

Pelita Bandung Raya
Manager:  Dejan Antonić

Persijap Jepara
Manager:  Raja Isa

Persita Tangerang
Manager:  Arcan Iurie

Group 2
Arema Cronous
Manager:  Suharno

Persepam Madura United
Manager:  Daniel Roekito

Persela Lamongan
Manager:  Eduard Tjong

Persija Jakarta
Manager:  Benny Dollo

Group 3
Persebaya Surabaya
Manager:  Rahmad Darmawan

Gresik United
Manager:  Agus Yuwono

Persiba Bantul
Manager:  Sajuri Sahid (caretaker)

Persik Kediri
Manager:  Aris Budi Sulistyo (caretaker)

Kalimantan zone
Barito Putera
Manager:  Salahudin

Mitra Kukar
Manager:  Stefan Hansson

Persiba Balikpapan
Manager:  Jaya Hartono

Putra Samarinda
Manager:  Mundari Karya

Papua-Sulawesi zone
Persipura Jayapura
Manager:  Jacksen F. Tiago

Perseru Serui
Manager:  Robby Maruanaya

Persiram Raja Ampat
Manager:  Gomes de Olivera

PSM Makassar
Manager:  Jorg Steinburnner

References

qualification